The Nippon Professional Baseball Rookie of the Year Award is given to one player in each league of Central League and Pacific League.

Winners

Central League

Pacific League

See also
Nippon Professional Baseball#Awards
Baseball awards#Japan
List of Nippon Professional Baseball earned run average champions

Nippon Professional Baseball trophies and awards
Awards established in 1950
1950 establishments in Japan
Rookie player awards